Dəyirmanlar (known as Mixaylovka until 1998) is a village and municipality in the Goranboy Rayon of Azerbaijan. It has a population of 897.  The municipality consists of the villages of Dəyirmanlar and Azad.

References

Populated places in Goranboy District